Tower Square is a 29-story commercial office building located in Springfield, Massachusetts. The building was developed by Mass Mutual. Constructed in 1970 by Pietro Belluschi; it was designed in the brutalist international style.

Change from MassMutual to Wellfleet 
During 2019, MassMutual removed its logo from the Tower Square. At summer time in 2021, Wellfleet added their logo to the top of the building facing the Memorial Bridge.

See also 
 Metro Center, Springfield, Massachusetts
 Monarch Place
 List of tallest buildings in Springfield, Massachusetts
 List of tallest buildings Massachusetts outside of Boston
 List of tallest buildings in Boston

References 

Buildings and structures in Springfield, Massachusetts
Commercial buildings completed in 1970
1970 establishments in Massachusetts
Commercial buildings in Massachusetts